The Belgian Cup 2008–09 was the 54th season of the main knockout football competition in Belgium. It is commonly named Cofidis Cup, after its sponsor Cofidis. It was won by Genk.

Bracket

Legend
 * = after extra-time
 D2 = second division
 D3 = third division

Results
In the first two rounds, teams from the provincial leagues and promotion division played each other. In the third round, teams from the third division joined in. Round four was the starting point for the teams from the second division. After the fifth round, only 14 teams remained.

Round 6
Teams from the Jupiler Pro League entered the competition at this stage. Teams from the first division were seeded and couldn't meet each other, except for the newly promoted teams, Kortrijk and Tubize, who did not belong to this seeded group.

Apart from the 18 teams directly qualified, 14 other teams had qualified through winning in the fifth round:
 7 teams from Second Division (D2): Beveren, OH Leuven, Lierse, KV Oostende, Ronse, Tournai and KVSK United.
 7 teams from Third Division (D3): Dessel, Diegem, RC Mechelen, Mol-Wezel, Seraing, Turnhout and Veldwezelt.

The draw was made on September 3, 2008.

Round 7
The draw for the seventh round and the quarterfinals was made on November 21, 2008. The match between Cercle Brugge and Charleroi was postponed from January 13 to January 21 due to insufficient pitch conditions.

Quarter-finals
The quarter-finals were two-legged.

First legs

Second legs
The matches Kortrijk – KV Mechelen and Roeselare – Cercle Brugge were postponed to 17 February due to insufficient pitch conditions.

Lierse won 3–1 on aggregate

Genk won 2–1 on aggregate

KV Mechelen won 1–0 on aggregate

2–2 on aggregate, Cercle Brugge won on away goals

Semifinals
The semifinals were also two-legged. The draw was made on February 10, 2009.

First legs

Second legs

3–3 on aggregate, KV Mechelen won on penalties

Genk won 6–3 on aggregate

Final

External links
 soccerway.com

References

Belgian Cup seasons
Belgian Cup, 2008-09
2008–09 in Belgian football